Grasshopper was the nickname for a cannon used by the British in the late 18th century as a light battalion gun to support infantry. It was designed for service in rough terrain such as the frontiers of British North America.

Its barrel was made of bronze instead of iron. Bronze is less brittle than cast iron, and so the barrel could be made thinner and lighter than that of an iron gun. If a bronze gun developed a defect it would rupture; an iron gun with a flaw would shatter, at great cost to its own crew. It fired a  ball (or same weight of canister shot).

Using the conventional bracket or split trail, the gun could be moved by its own crew using drag ropes and wooden shafts much like a handcart. Two straight shafts were placed on each side of the cheek pieces facing forward, and two angled ones at the trail.  The appearance of the shafts when fixed in place led to the nickname of Grasshopper.

Famous battles with grasshopper cannon

Cowpens in the American Revolution
Guilford Courthouse in the American Revolution
Yorktown in the American Revolution
Craney Island in the War of 1812
Frenchtown in the War of 1812
Queenston Heights in the War of 1812

See also

American Revolution
Artillery
Leather cannon
War of 1812

Sources

http://johnsmilitaryhistory.com/threepdr.html

Artillery of the United Kingdom
Field artillery
Infantry guns